Moorefield is an unincorporated community in Harrison County, in the U.S. state of Ohio.

History
Moorefield was platted in 1815. The community derives its name from Michael Moore, one of the founders. A post office has been in operation at Moorefield since 1819.

References

Unincorporated communities in Harrison County, Ohio
Unincorporated communities in Ohio